State Route 380 (SR 380) is a north–south state highway in the southwestern quadrant of the U.S. state of Ohio. Its northern terminus is in downtown Xenia, following a brief concurrency with US 68, at the signalized intersection where the U.S. route meets US 42.

Route description
Along its way, SR 380 travels through the northwestern part of Clinton County and the southwestern quadrant of Greene County.  No segment of SR 380 is included within the National Highway System (NHS).  The NHS is a network of highways deemed most important for the economy, mobility and defense of the country.

History
SR 380 was assigned in 1935.  Initially, it served as a spur route that ran along its present alignment from its current northern terminus in downtown Xenia southwest to the former northwestern Clinton County village of New Burlington.  Three years after its designation, SR 380 was extended to the southeast from New Burlington along a previously un-numbered roadway to its present southern terminus at the US 22/SR 3 concurrency near Clarksville.

Major intersections

References

380
Transportation in Clinton County, Ohio
Transportation in Greene County, Ohio